Gojo Industries, Inc., is a privately held manufacturer of hand hygiene and skin care products founded in 1946, in Akron, Ohio, where it is again headquartered after a period in Cuyahoga Falls. One of its most well-known products is Purell, a hand sanitizer. It offers an electronic hand hygiene monitoring system for medical institutions.

History 
Gojo was founded in Akron, Ohio, by Jerry and Goldie Lippman. During World War II, Goldie worked at the Miller Tire Co. rubber factory and Jerry at the Goodyear Aircraft plant. Like other employees there, both often came home with sticky, difficult-to-remove graphite, tar, and carbon on their hands and clothes. They disliked the products the cleaners used to clean their clothes, so they set out to find an effective cleaning product that could be used without water. Goldie and Jerry worked with Professor Clarence Cook of Kent State University’s chemistry department to formulate a heavy-duty hand cleaner. They called it Gojo Hand Cleaner and sold it to rubber workers, who had sometimes used benzene and other noxious chemicals to clean their skin. After the war they began marketing to automotive service facilities. They quit their factory jobs and started Gojo.

The company's first name and product was GoGo, Goldie's nickname, but another company had already used the name, so the founders came up with Gojo, with the "G" standing for Goldie and the "J" standing for Jerry.

In 1950, Gojo invented a liquid soap dispenser after realizing that users were using much more than was needed to clean their hands, causing buyers to think the product was too expensive. Jerry Lipmann filed a patent for this portion-limiting dispenser in 1952. The original product was meant to clean, not sanitize the skin. In 1988, the company developed the Purell product to disinfect hands.

In 2004, Gojo sold Pfizer the exclusive rights to distribute Purell in the consumer market, while Gojo Industries retained the rights to existing industrial markets. In 2006, Pfizer sold its Consumer Healthcare division, and hence the rights to Purell, to Johnson & Johnson. In 2010, Gojo bought the brand back from Johnson & Johnson.

In February 2014, Gojo Industries acquired privately held Laboratoires Prodene Klint of Croissy-Beaubourg, France. The acquisition allows both companies greater geographic footprint and increased manufacturing operations. Prodene Klint manufactures professional hygiene, cosmetics and disinfectant products.

On June 6, 2015, Gojo launched its Gojo Smartlink Observation System, a mobile application that connects to Gojo Smartlink web-based software and allows for the electronic collection and collation of hand hygiene and personal protective equipment (PPE) compliance metrics. On 1 January 2020, Carey Jaros became Gojo president and CEO.

Operations

Gojo operates worldwide, with offices in the United Kingdom, France, Australia, Japan, and Brazil. It has factories in Ohio and across North America, as well as in Latin America, South America, Europe, and Asia. Gojo's main manufacturing and distribution facilities are at its Lippman Campus in Cuyahoga Falls, Ohio.

Ownership
Gojo is a private, family-owned company. In 1946, Gojo was founded by Jerome "Jerry" Lippman and Goldie Lippman. Today, Joseph Kanfer runs the company of his uncle and aunt, along with other family members. Kanfer's eldest daughter, Marcella Kanfer Rolnick, is vice chairwoman of Gojo's board. Marcella Kanfer Rolnick also runs The Lippman Kanfer Family Foundation focused on Jewish philanthropy and its sister organization Lippman Kanfer Foundation for Living Torah, along with other family members.

Products
Gojo manufactures and markets skin health and hygiene solutions for away-from-home settings. Its products include hand soaps and sanitizers, moisturizers, shower washes, shampoos, foam hand washes, surgical scrubs, perineal care products, skin conditioners, chemical removing hand cleaners, hand protection products, and dispensers. Gojo's products are usually found in public facilities. For many of these facilities, such as manufacturing and hospitals, Gojo makes placement guides recommending consumers place various Gojo product brands in strategic locations. Gojo's most popular products are its industrial hand soaps and sanitizers, as well as its Provon and Purell brands.

Headquarters
Gojo's main office is a  building at One Gojo Plaza on South Main Street in Akron, Ohio. The company bought the property from the City of Akron for $1 in 2000 as part of a deal to bring its headquarters to downtown Akron from Cuyahoga Falls. Originally the headquarters of Goodrich Corporation and then Michelin Americas Small Tires, the building now holds about 600 Gojo employees.

References

External links 
 Gojo Industries website

Companies based in Akron, Ohio
Privately held companies based in Ohio
Manufacturing companies based in Ohio
Chemical companies established in 1946
Antiseptics
1946 establishments in Ohio